Portrait of Jerónimo de Cevallos is a 1609-1613 work by El Greco, from late in his Toledo period. It originally hung in the Quinta del Duque del Arco in the Royal Palace of El Pardo in Madrid but now in the Museo del Prado.

It shows Jerónimo de Cevallos, a distinguished jurist of natural law at Escalona but also frequently in Toledo on business as a secretary and councillor for that city. Several sources note that he was the patron and protector of the painter's son Jorge Manuel. The neutral background is influenced by Titian and the Venetian School.

Bibliography 
 ÁLVAREZ LOPERA, José, El Greco, Madrid, Arlanza, 2005, Biblioteca «Descubrir el Arte», (colección «Grandes maestros»). 
 SCHOLZ-HÄNSEL, Michael, El Greco, Colonia, Taschen, 2003.

External links
ArteHistoria.com. «Jerónimo Cevallos». [Consulta: 09.01.2011].

References

Paintings by El Greco in the Museo del Prado
Cevallos, Jeronimo
1610s paintings
1600s paintings
Cevallos, Jeronimo
Cevallos, Jeronimo